Nicholas Devlin (born 17 October 1993) is a  Scottish professional footballer who plays as a right-sided full-back for and captains Scottish Premiership side Livingston.

Career
Devlin signed for Dumbarton in the summer of 2009, and broke into the first team during the 2010–11 season. Devlin signed a pre-contract agreement with SPL side Motherwell in March 2011. As part of the deal, Jordan Halsman's loan deal at Dumbarton was extended until the end of the season, and Motherwell played a pre-season friendly against Dumbarton, which Motherwell won 5–0. Devlin officially joined on 1 July 2011.

Devlin was injured for most of the 2011–12 season, but came back at the start of 2012 and turned in some excellent performances for the Motherwell under-19 team. On 29 March 2012, Devlin joined Stenhousemuir on loan until the end of the season where he was awarded the Young Player of the Month award for April, his first full month at the club.

On 17 August 2012, Devlin re-joined Dumbarton on loan until January 2013, which was subsequently extended for a further twenty-eight days. On 15 March 2013, Devlin was again farmed out on loan, re-joining Stenhousemuir till the end of the season. On 20 May 2013, after not making a single first-team appearance for Motherwell, Devlin was released by the club.

Upon being released by Motherwell, he was quickly signed on a permanent contract by Stenhousemuir, who he had two previous loan spells with, for the 2013–14 season. At the end of the season, he was one of a number of players released by the club.

In July 2014, Devlin signed for Ayr United. He was made club captain on 19 May 2015. However, after the club's relegation from the Scottish Championship, Devlin announced he would be leaving Ayr in May 2017 at the end of his contract.

Devlin signed for League One club Walsall in June 2017 on a two-year contract. He was offered a new contract by Walsall at the end of the 2018–19 season, however he opted to move back to Scotland.

In June 2019, Devlin signed for Scottish Premiership side Livingston.

Coaching career
In June 2020, Devlin agreed to join the under-20 coaching staff of West of Scotland Football League side Rossvale. He has also been brought in by David Gormley to assist in first team training sessions.

Career statistics

References

External links
 
 

1993 births
Living people
Scottish footballers
Footballers from Glasgow
Association football defenders
Dumbarton F.C. players
Motherwell F.C. players
Stenhousemuir F.C. players
Ayr United F.C. players
Scottish Football League players
Scottish Professional Football League players
People educated at Turnbull High School
Walsall F.C. players
English Football League players
Livingston F.C. players
Sportspeople from Bishopbriggs